Bristol County is a county located in the U.S. state of Rhode Island. As of the 2020 census, the population was 50,793, making it the least populous county in Rhode Island. In terms of land area, it is the third-smallest county in the United States, at only . The county was created in 1747 when it was separated from Bristol County, Massachusetts. Bristol County is included in the Providence-Warwick, RI-MA Metropolitan Statistical Area, which in turn constitutes a portion of the greater Boston-Worcester-Providence, MA-RI-NH-CT Combined Statistical Area.

History

The county was formed by the transfer of part of Bristol County, Massachusetts, to the Colony of Rhode Island in 1746, having been the subject of a long-running border dispute.

The original county was part of the Plymouth Colony and named after its "shire town" (county seat), what is now Bristol, Rhode Island. The new Rhode Island county was formed in 1746 with the full modern territory of Bristol, Barrington, and Warren.

See Bristol County, Massachusetts for later land transfers between Massachusetts and Rhode Island.

Geography
It is the smallest county in Rhode Island. In land area only (water area omitted), it is the third-smallest county in the United States, following Kalawao County, Hawaii and New York County, New York (Manhattan). The highest point in the county is Mount Hope, in Bristol, which stands 217 feet (66 m) above sea level.

Adjacent counties
 Bristol County, Massachusetts: east
 Providence County, Rhode Island: north
 Kent County, Rhode Island: west
 Newport County, Rhode Island: south

Demographics

2000 census
As of the census of 2000, there were 50,648 people, 19,033 households, and 13,361 families living in the county. The racial makeup of the county was 96.81% White, 0.69% Black or African American, 0.16% Native American, 1% Asian, 0.03% Pacific Islander, 0.3% from other races, and 1.01% from two or more races. Of the population 1.13% were Hispanic or Latino of any race. 24.7% were of Portuguese, 18.6% Italian, 12.4% Irish, 10.5% English and 5.9% French ancestry. 85.4% spoke English, 10.4% Portuguese and 1.3% Spanish as their first language. The United States Census Bureau reported Bristol County as being one of two counties in the United States with a plurality of people of Portuguese ancestry (the other being contiguous Bristol County, Massachusetts).

There were 19,033 households, out of which 31.80% had children under the age of 18 living with them, 57.30% were married couples living together, 9.90% had a female householder with no husband present, and 29.80% were non-families. Of all households 25.10% were made up of individuals, and 11.20% had someone living alone who was 65 years of age or older.  The average household size was 2.52 and the average family size was 3.04.

In the county, the population was spread out, with 22.90% under the age of 18, 9.50% from 18 to 24, 27.40% from 25 to 44, 23.40% from 45 to 64, and 16.70% who were 65 years of age or older.  The median age was 39 years. For every 100 females, there were 93.10 males.  For every 100 females age 18 and over, there were 89.50 males.

The median income for a household in the county was $50,737, and the median income for a family was $63,114. Males had a median income of $41,902 versus $28,985 for females. The per capita income for the county was $26,503.  About 4.40% of families and 6.30% of the population were below the poverty line, including 6.20% of those under age 18 and 9.60% of those age 65 or over.

2010 census
As of the 2010 United States Census, there were 49,875 people, 19,150 households, and 12,750 families living in the county. The racial makeup of the county was 95.7% white, 1.4% Asian, 0.8% black or African American, 0.2% American Indian, 0.4% from other races, and 1.5% from two or more races. Those of Hispanic or Latino origin made up 2.0% of the population. The largest ancestry groups were:
  24.8% Portuguese
  22.2% Irish
  21.0% Italian
  14.5% English
  9.8% French
  8.1% German
  4.4% French Canadian
  4.3% Polish
  2.9% Scottish
  2.7% American
  2.4% Swedish
  2.0% Scotch-Irish
  1.5% Greek
  1.4% Russian

Of the 19,150 households, 29.8% had children under the age of 18 living with them, 53.4% were married couples living together, 9.8% had a female householder with no husband present, 33.4% were non-families, and 27.4% of all households were made up of individuals. The average household size was 2.44 and the average family size was 2.99. The median age was 42.9 years.

The median income for a household in the county was $68,333 and the median income for a family was $87,781. Males had a median income of $59,725 versus $44,060 for females. The per capita income for the county was $35,588. About 3.5% of families and 6.5% of the population were below the poverty line, including 4.2% of those under age 18 and 5.4% of those age 65 or over.

Politics

|}

Communities

The following towns are located in Bristol County:
 Barrington
 Bristol (traditional county seat)
 Warren

Education
There are two school districts in the county: Barrington School District and Bristol-Warren Regional School District.

See also
 National Register of Historic Places listings in Bristol County, Rhode Island

References

 
1747 establishments in Rhode Island
Counties in Greater Boston
Populated places established in 1747
Portuguese-American culture in Rhode Island
Providence metropolitan area